Dulcești is a commune in Neamț County, Western Moldavia, Romania. It is composed of six villages: Brițcani, Cârlig, Corhana, Dulcești, Poiana and Roșiori.

References

Communes in Neamț County
Localities in Western Moldavia